Norma C. Donaldson (August 18, 1928 – November 22, 1994) was an American actress and singer. Perhaps she is best known for her roles, as Miss Adelaide in the 1976 revival of Guys and Dolls; Lillie Belle Barber on the  CBS television soap opera The Young and the Restless, in which she played from 1990 until her death in 1994.

Biography

Early life
Donaldson was born Norma C. Donaldson in the Harlem section of New York City. Her parents were Laura, a housekeeper and Fredrick Donaldson (b. 1906; d. 1955). The first of two children, Donaldson attended Boys and Girls High School (known at the time as Girls' High School), studying there until her junior year.

Career
In 1949, Donaldson then aged 21, launched her career as a nightclub singer, booking gigs in throughout New York City. During her nightclub stint, Donaldson began touring with Harry Belafonte and later Lena Horne. Donaldson began her acting career in the late–1960s, first appearing in an episode of Callback! which aired on March 8, 1969, in which Barry Manilow was music director of this show. Beginning in the 1970s, Donaldson began appearing in some Blaxploitation films. Most notably of the genre, Donaldson portrayed Gloria Roberts in 1972's Across 110th Street and Honey in 1973's Willie Dynamite.

In 1975, Donaldson began her acting career on Broadway and was most famous for portraying the loveless chorine Miss Adelaide, opposite Robert Guillaume, in an all–black revival of Frank Loesser's Guys and Dolls which premiered in 1976. Donaldson co–starred alongside Guillaume again in Purlie and No Place to be Somebody. Prior to her lengthy recurring role on "The Young and the Restless", she had played Dr. Paulina Ravelle on General Hospital on a recurring basis from 1987 to 1989, who strove to prevent her daughter, Simone, from marrying the white Dr. Tom Hardy.

Personal life and death
Donaldson never married or had children. Donaldson died of cancer at Cedars Sinai Hospital in Los Angeles, California on November 22, 1994, at 66 years old. She was buried at Inglewood Park Cemetery in Los Angeles, California.

Filmography

Film

Television

Theater

References

External links

1928 births
1994 deaths
American soap opera actresses
Actresses from New York (state)
20th-century American actresses
20th-century American singers
Nightclub performers
20th-century American women singers